The following are events that occurred in Antarctica in 2018.

Events
January 4th - An ice drilling project near Minna Bluff is estimated to be finished on this date.
January 25th - An ice drilling project in Ong Valley is estimated to be finished on this date.
May 4th - Foundation Trough, Patuxent Trough, and Offset Rift Basin, canyons that divide the two major regions of the continent, is able to be seen and is mapped for the first time.

References

 
 
2010s in Antarctica
Years of the 21st century in Antarctica